The Republican Citizens Committee Against National Prohibition was established shortly before the 1932 Republican National Convention to pressure the party to support the repeal of prohibition. Key members included Joseph H. Choate, Jr., Henry Bourne Joy, Thomas W. Phillips, Raymond Pitcairn, and Lammot du Pont.

External links
 Pierre S. du Pont and the Making of an Anti-Prohibition Activist 

Prohibition in the United States
1932 establishments in the United States
Political organizations based in the United States
Organizations established in 1932